Western Marine Shipyard Limited is a public listed shipbuilding company based in Chattogram, Bangladesh. The shipyard has constructed various types of vessels till date, including ocean going multi purpose cargo vessels, passenger vessels & boats, oil tankers, ro-ro ferry, pontoons, barges, fishing trawlers, dredgers, tug boats, container vessels, etc. Western Marine Shipyard is the country's largest shipbuilder, standing with over 42 acres of land, modernized into a shipyard consisting of all sorts of tech & heavy machinery. Sitting in the Eastern Bank of the Karnaphuli river in Chittagong, it is an employment source for 3500 people; including skilled and semi skilled labors. More than five hundred marine professionals are also working in the shipyard. Including marine experts, mechanical engineers, electrical engineers, naval architects & experts in other fields. As a result of that, today, they are constructing vessels for buyers around the world [see Projects] and owns 89 percent of Bangladesh's shipbuilding market.

History
The mother company, Western Marine Services, was initially formed by a group of marine professionals specialized in ship repairing and the export of marine supplies. Gradually the company developed as a shipbuilder with its own shipyard, in the year 2000; with over 1.5 acres of land for building inland vessels. Today Western Marine Shipyard is one of the biggest shipbuilders in the country, standing with over 42 acres of land, modernized into a shipyard consisting of all sorts of tech & heavy machinery. Sitting in the Eastern Bank of the Karnaphuli river in Chittagong, it is an employment source for 3500 people; including skilled and semi skilled labors. More than five hundred marine professionals are also working in the shipyard. Including marine experts, mechanical engineers, electrical engineers, naval architects & experts in other fields. Today, being Bangladesh's largest shipyard, it owns 89 percent of the countries shipbuilding market and has exported most than 31 vessels to over 12 countries around the world. The yard also has signed a MoU with the Chittagong Dry Dock in order to aid the CDD with developing heavy steel engineering capabilities and provide them necessary technical support. Additionally, Western Marine is constructing 20 class certified cargo vessels for local company Evergreen Shipping Line; this deal is considered to be Bangladesh's largest ship order contract in terms of quantity of ships. On 16 June 2019, Captain Sohail Hasan took over as Managing Director (MD) of the company, as was decided by the board of directors.

Shipyard facilities
The shipyard utilizes workshops, logistical resources, and equipment for the building of their ships. The yard stands over 42 acres of land, and employs a workforce of over 3500 all together.

The following are some of the shipyard's facilities:
 Design house
 Bonded warehouse
 Blasting shop
CNC (Computer Numerical Control) shop
 Bending shop
Mechanical and Carpentry shop
 Fabrication yard and shed
 Painting shop
 5 slipways
 Heavy lifting equipment
Gantry crane
Mobile hydraulic crane
 Barge mounted crane
 etc.
 Healthcare facilities
 etc.

Health and safety
In its early days, the yard faced many difficulties in promoting and maintaining safety standards. During the period, around 2011, there were 1000 injuries a month; injuries including electrical shock, eye injuries, hearing damage, etc. In conjunction with the Deutsche Gesellschaft für Internationale Zusammenarbeit (GIZ) Western Marine set itself to analyze the risks and hazards their workers faced. This was the first partnership of this kind in Bangladesh, using private sector infrastructure for the provision of public health services. Through this, strict reporting procedures were established, and training was provided for managers and workers; including annual firefighting training. Today, with the addition of new services and procedures, Western Marine has seen a 99% reduction in accidents. Because of this, they were given the OHSAS 18001 certificate from Bureau Veritas.

The shipyard contains a PHCC (Primary Health Care Center), which was created in coordination with the GIZ and the Bangladesh Ministry of Health and Family Welfare. In this free of charge facility, shipyard workers are given tests for their hearing, their lungs, and total physical checkups. This facility is always available for use, and workers can receive aid and treatment whenever, and as fast as necessary. The government Health Ministry provides a nurse in addition to the doctor and paramedics that are provided by the shipyard. This facility is also accessible to the local community, where more than 30,000 people, including many of the workers and their families, live.

Importantly, the workers and other personnel are given precautionary equipment when on the yard grounds. This equipment includes:
 Safety helmet (hardhat)
 Boiler suit
 Protective gloves
 Safety goggles
 Safety lamps (for use within enclosed spaces)
 Fire extinguishers throughout the yard
 Firefighting hydrants and hoses throughout the yard
 Breathing apparatus when necessary
 Safety harnesses and belts
 Ear plugs
 Dust masks
 Safety boots

Awards and certifications 
Western Marine Shipyard has received two certificates from Bureau Veritas; one is OHSAS 18001 for health & safety & ISO 14001 for environment. They also received the ISO 9001 certificate from Germanischer Lloyd for quality. This has made them the only IMS (Integrated Management System) certified company in Bangladesh.

Furthermore, WMS has received a number of awards; including the 2016 Bangladeshi President's Award for Industrial Development (in the Hi-Tech industries category), the 8th HSBC Export Excellence Award, the Gold National Export Trophy for the 2010-2011 financial year, and the World Maritime Day Award in 2007.

Projects 
Western Marine Shipyard exported 31 ships to various countries of the world (Finland, Germany, Pakistan, Denmark, Tanzania, Uganda, Ecuador, New Zealand, Gambia, Kenya, India, UAE, etc.) and brought around US$151 Million of remittance. The yard has built more than 60 ships which includes ocean going multi purpose cargo vessels, passenger vessels & boats, oil tankers, ro-ro ferries, pontoons, barges, fishing trawlers, dredgers, tug boats, container vessels, and more, with further plans to export more than $250 million worth of ships. Western Marine operates in conjunction with classification societies through the entire building and testing process of new vessels. The yard has worked with Bureau Veritas, DNV-GL, Nippon Kaiji Kyokai (ClassNK), and Lloyd's Register to insure class built ships for their buyers.

In 2017, the Finance Minister of Bangladesh, Abul Maal Abdul Muhith, identified WMS as one of the top twenty loan defaulters in the country. However, the shipyard has rescheduled its defaulted loans with two banks and has started to repay installments regularly.

See also
Shipbuilding in Bangladesh

References

External links
 

Shipbuilding companies of Bangladesh
Shipyards of Bangladesh
Manufacturing companies based in Chittagong
Karnaphuli River